Phú Yên Football Club is a professional football club, based in Tuy Hòa, Phú Yên, Vietnam, that plays in the Vietnam National Championship Division Three, the fourth tier of Vietnamese football.

Current squad

'As April 2017''

References

External links
 

Phú Yên F.C.